Ahmed Abdel Hamid El-Saharty (born 26 August 1950) is an Egyptian basketball player. He competed in the men's tournament at the 1972 Summer Olympics and the 1976 Summer Olympics.

References

External links
 

1950 births
Living people
Egyptian men's basketball players
1970 FIBA World Championship players
Olympic basketball players of Egypt
Basketball players at the 1972 Summer Olympics
Basketball players at the 1976 Summer Olympics
Place of birth missing (living people)